Billy Ketkeophomphone (born 24 March 1990) is a professional footballer who plays as a striker . Born in France, he represents the Laos national team at international level.

Club career

Early career
Born in Champigny-sur-Marne, Ketkeophomphone began his career with Racing Paris, before joining the prestigious Clairefontaine academy in 2003. After three years, he left the club to sign for Strasbourg. In summer 2008, he was promoted to the first team. He made his debut against Bastia on 1 December 2009 in the Championnat National playing 44 minutes.

On 20 May 2011, he signed a five-year contract with Swiss Super League side Sion. He was released on 31 January 2012 and subsequently returned to France to sign a four-year deal with Tours.

Angers
On 16 June 2015, Ketkeophomphone signed with Angers, who had just been promoted to Ligue 1. He was the first footballer of Southeast Asian descent to have played in the top division of French football. On 4 October, he scored his first goal for Angers against Bastia. He played 38 games that season, scoring 6 goals.

In his second season, he sustained a knee injury, restricting him to only five games, but still managed to score a goal.

Auxerre
On 31 August 2018, the last day of the 2018 summer transfer window, Ketkeophomphone moved down a division and joined Auxerre. He made his debut on 14 September 2018 in a match against Clermont Foot.

Cholet
On 20 November 2019, Ketkeophomphone joined Championnat National side Cholet. He made his debut and scored first goal for Cholet on 22 November 2019 in a match against Red Star.

Dunkerque
On 1 July 2020, Ketkeophomphone joined Ligue 2 side Dunkerque on a two-year deal. He made his debut on 22 August 2020 in a match against Toulouse. On 29 August 2020, Ketkeophomphone scored his first goal for Dunkerque in the 39th minute against Clermont Foot. He left the club in January 2022.

Sri Pahang
On 28 January 2022, Ketkeophomphone signed with Malaysian club Sri Pahang. He made his debut on 6 April 2022 in a match against Kedah Darul Aman.

International career
Born to Laotian refugee parents who fled to France in the 1980s, Ketkeophomphone has expressed interest in representing Laos internationally. In 2021, he was called up to the Laotian squad for the 2020 AFF Championship. Ketkeophomphone made his debut for Laos on 6 December 2021 in the AFF Cup against Vietnam.

Career statistics

International

References

External links
 
 

1990 births
Living people
Association football forwards
Laotian footballers
Laos international footballers
French footballers
French people of Laotian descent
French sportspeople of Asian descent
RC Strasbourg Alsace players
FC Sion players
Racing Club de France Football players
Angers SCO players
AJ Auxerre players
SO Cholet players
USL Dunkerque players
Sri Pahang FC players
Ligue 1 players
Ligue 2 players
Championnat National players
Swiss Super League players
Laotian expatriate footballers
Expatriate footballers in Switzerland
Laotian expatriate sportspeople in Switzerland
Expatriate footballers in Malaysia
Laotian expatriate sportspeople in Malaysia